Luis Raúl Cardoso (born 18 July 1930) was an Argentine footballer. He played in seven matches for the Argentina national football team from 1956 to 1959. He was also part of Argentina's squad for the 1959 South American Championship that took place in Argentina.

References

External links
 

1930 births
Possibly living people
Argentine footballers
Argentina international footballers
Place of birth missing (living people)
Association football defenders
Club Atlético Tigre footballers
Boca Juniors footballers
Club Atlético Atlanta footballers